This is a list of Hawaii suffragists, suffrage groups and others associated with the cause of women's suffrage in Hawaii.

Groups 

Maui Women's Suffrage Association, formed in 1919.
National American Woman Suffrage Association (NAWSA).
National Women's Equal Suffrage Association of Hawai'i (WESAH), formed in 1912.
Women's Christian Temperance Union (WCTU).

Suffragists 

 Akaiko Akana.
Mary Kinimaka Ha'aheo Atcherley.
Ethel Frances Baldwin.
Mary Tenney Castle.
Wilhelmine Kekelaokalaninui Widemann Dowsett.
Mary E. Dillingham Frear.
Elizabeth Kahanu Kalaniana'ole.
Margaret Knepper.
Emilie K. Widemann Macfarlane.
Louise MacMillan.
 Emma Nakuina.
 Emma Nāwahī.
Emma Ahuena Taylor.
Lahilahi Webb.

Politicians in support of women's suffrage 

 Charles J. McCarthy.
Joseph Nāwahī.
William Pūnohu White.
John E. Bush.
Jonah Kūhiō Kalanianaʻole.

Suffragists who campaigned in Hawaii 

 Carrie Chapman Catt.
Almira Hollander Pitman.

Anti-suffragists in Hawaii 
Groups

 Massachusetts Association Opposed to the Further Extension of Suffrage to Women.

See also 

 Timeline of women's suffrage in Hawaii
 Women's suffrage in Hawaii
 Women's suffrage in states of the United States
 Women's suffrage in the United States

References

Sources

External links 
 Wilhelmine Dowsett: Hawai'i Suffrage Pioneer

Hawaii suffragists
 
suffragists